Each of the 14 regions of Namibia is further subdivided into electoral constituencies.  The size of the constituencies varies with the size and population of each region. There are currently 121 constituencies in Namibia. The most populous constituency according to the 2011 census was Rundu Urban in the Kavango West region with 63,431 people; the least populous was Okatyali in the Oshana region with 3,187 people.
The administrative division of Namibia is tabled by Delimitation Commissions and accepted or declined by the National Assembly. In 1992, the First Delimitation Commission chaired by Judge President Johan Strydom determined the number of constituencies to be 95. Since then, every Delimitation Commission has increased this number to accommodate population growth. The fourth Delimitation Commission increased the number of constituencies to its present number in 2013.

Local councillors are directly elected through secret ballots (regional elections) by the inhabitants of their constituencies. They occupy a constituency office in the main settlement of their district. However, once elected they keep their full-time job and are expected to run their constituencies after hours. Consequently, they receive allowances rather than salaries, although the remuneration does compare to a mid-range salaried position.

Regional councillors are indirectly elected from and by the constituency councillors in each region. Each region sends three of their local councillors to represent their region in the National Council of Namibia.

List of constituencies

References 

 
Subdivisions of Namibia
Namibia, Constituencies
Namibia 2
Constituencies
Namibia